Petre "Petea" Vâlcov (1910 – 16 November 1943) was a Romanian football player. Forming a well-known attacking triple for Venus București alongside his two brothers, Colea and Volodea, he was one of the most efficient goal-scorers in the Romanian First League.

Career 

He played for only two clubs : Mihai Viteazu Chişinău and Venus București. Despite his goalscoring ability, he was never the top-goalscorer of the Divizia A.

International career 

Petea Vâlcov made his debut for the national side in a June 1933 Balkan Cup match against Bulgaria. He had a great spell and scored two goals as Romania won 7–0.
Vâlcov played a total of seven games for the Tricolours and netted four goals.

International Goals

Death 
In 1941, Petea was enrolled in the Romanian Army and was sent on the Second World War's Eastern Front. He died in November 1943, fighting against the Soviets in the Kalmyk Steppe.

Honours
Venus București
Liga I (5): 1931–32, 1933–34, 1936–37, 1938–39, 1939–40

References

External links 
 Deceased footballers at RomanianSoccer.ro 
 
 
 

1910 births
1943 deaths
Association football forwards
Romanian footballers
Romania international footballers
Liga I players
Venus București players
Romanian military personnel of World War II
Romanian military personnel killed in World War II